Thomas Shirley (1564–c. 1634) was an English soldier, adventurer and politician.

Thomas Shirley may also refer to:

Thomas Shirley (died 1544), MP for Steyning
Thomas Shirley (died 1612) (c. 1542–1612), English knight
Sir Thomas Shirley, 1st Baronet (1727–1800), colonial head of the Bahamas, Governor of the Leeward Islands
Thomas Shirley (Royal Navy officer) (1733–1814), leader of Shirley's Gold Coast expedition
Thomas Shirley (RAF officer) (1908–1982), British air marshal

See also
Shirley Thomas (disambiguation)